The Yosemite Museum is located in Yosemite Valley in Yosemite National Park in California.  Founded in 1926 through the efforts of Ansel Franklin Hall, the museum's displays focus on the heritage and culture of the Ahwahnechee people who lived in the valley. The collection also includes both utilitarian and made-for-sale baskets dating from c. 1870 to present and is one of the only existing collections encompassing this depth and time span for any group in California.

The adjacent Yosemite Valley Visitor Center features exhibits about the park's geology, wildlife, Native American and other settlers, John Muir, and the park's history.

History
The Yosemite Museum was one of the first museums established in the NPS, and its collection is one of the largest in the system.  The first "museum" in Yosemite predated the Park Service:  it was an arboretum established in 1904 by Major John Bigelow, Acting Superintendent, near the Wawona Hotel.  In 1915, a museum which focused on natural history was established in the Park Headquarters Building in Yosemite Valley, and in 1922 the museum moved to what had been artist Chris Jorgensen's home and studio near Sentinel Bridge.  The increased space allowed the addition of historic, ethnographic and geological materials to the exhibits, and the museum was extremely popular with visitors. 
 
The idea of establishing park museums to promote outdoor education had national support in the 1920s, and the Yosemite Museum was a direct beneficiary.  The Committee on Museums in National Parks, set up by the American Association of Museums, presented proposals for such museums to the Laura Spelman Rockefeller Memorial, and two awards were made.  One was a grant of $70,500 to build and equip a museum in Yosemite to serve as a model for this type of facility.  The building was completed and presented to the NPS by the American Association of Museums in 1925 and was opened to the public in 1926.  The two story building housed exhibits on geology, natural history, history, and ethnography as well as a research library, workrooms, and a meeting room.

The Yosemite Museum was largely converted to office space for non museum functions after the new Valley Visitor Center opened in 1966.  The vast majority of the collection is in storage, although some objects are exhibited in the Indian Cultural Exhibit (opened in 1976), the Museum Gallery (opened in 1988), the Pioneer Yosemite History Center, and the El Portal Transportation Exhibit.  Objects are often loaned to other museums and institutions for exhibition and research.  NPS staff and outside researchers rely on the resources of the Yosemite Museum collection and the closely associated Research Library and Archives in their investigations of the human and natural history of the park.

Collections
Highlights of the Yosemite Museum's collection include:
 First sketches of Yosemite by Thomas A. Ayres
 John Muir's tin cup
 Landscape paintings by Thomas Hill, Thomas Moran, William Keith, and Albert Bierstadt.
 100,000 historic park photographs
 Baskets by Lucy Telles and Maggie Howard
 The Schwabacher Basket Collection (Mono Lake Paiute and Miwok)

Architecture
The National Park Service rustic style became a cornerstone of the National Park Service's belief that buildings should blend in with their natural surroundings and that natural settings could influence architecture. Indigenous building material, such as native rocks, logs, and shakes (wood shingles), were utilized for all visible exterior parts. The architectural philosophy was that "(rustic style) gives the feeling of having been executed by pioneer craftsmen with limited hand tools. It thus achieves sympathy with natural surroundings and with the past."

The Yosemite Museum is exemplary of rustic style. It was constructed in the heart of an emerging village center, in which all buildings were to have a unified architectural theme. Museum architect Herbert Maier described the relationship between the Museum and its natural surroundings by saying, "The elevation of the museum stresses the horizontal—that seemed the logic of the situation ... to attempt altitudinal impressiveness here in a building would have meant entering into a competition with the cliffs."

Maier went on to design many structures that are considered exemplary rustic style. In 1933, Maier was hired by the National Park Service as the regional director for the Civilian Conservation Corps (CCC) work in state parks. In this capacity, Maier helped develop guidebooks to assist state park designers in using rustic design principles. These books were widely distributed and influenced design of park structures nationwide at a time when hundreds of new parks were developed with CCC labor.

See also
History of the Yosemite area
Indigenous peoples of California

References

External links

 NPS plan your visit — Yosemite Museums, Historic Buildings, and Cemeteries

1926 establishments in California
Historic district contributing properties in California
Museums in Mariposa County, California
Museums established in 1926
Native American museums in California
National Park Service rustic in Yosemite National Park
National Register of Historic Places in Mariposa County, California
Buildings and structures on the National Register of Historic Places in California
Museums on the National Register of Historic Places
National Park Service museums